Helen Henderson may refer to:
 Helen Timmons Henderson (1877–1925), American schoolteacher and politician from Virginia
 Helen Ruth Henderson (1898–1982), her daughter, Virginia schoolteacher and politician
 Helen Anne Henderson (1946–2015), Canadian disability rights activist and journalist
 Helen Henderson Chain (1849–1892), née Henderson, American artist and mountaineer